The clown coris (Coris aygula), also known as the clown wrasse, false clownwrasse, humphead wrasse, hump-headed wrasse, red-blotched rainbowfish or twinspot wrasse, is a species of wrasse native to the Indian Ocean and the western Pacific Ocean.

Description
A marked difference in appearance is noted between juveniles and adults; juveniles are white and orange with false eyes on the dorsal fin, while adults are uniformly dark green or with light banding and developing a prominent forehead.

Habitat
They are generally solitary as adults, while juveniles can often be found in tide pools.

Distribution
This species can be found from the Red Sea and the African coast eastward to the Line Islands and Ducie Island and from southern Japan to Lord Howe Island.

References

External links
 

Coris (fish)
Fish of the Red Sea
Fish described in 1801